Han Shuxiang (born 26 August 1965) is a Chinese former cyclist. He competed in the team time trial event at the 1984 Summer Olympics and 1986 Asian Games.

References

External links
 

1965 births
Living people
Chinese male cyclists
Olympic cyclists of China
Cyclists at the 1984 Summer Olympics
Place of birth missing (living people)
Asian Games medalists in cycling
Cyclists at the 1986 Asian Games
Medalists at the 1986 Asian Games
Asian Games gold medalists for China
20th-century Chinese people
21st-century Chinese people